Joseph-Adolphe Richard (February 14, 1887 – July 12, 1964) was a Liberal Member of the House of Commons of Canada.

He was born on February 14, 1887, in Saint-Grégoire, Quebec, and was a contractor.

Provincial Politics

Richard ran as a Liberal candidate in the provincial district of Saint-Maurice in the 1944 election.  He received 23% of the vote and finished third, behind Marc Trudel of the Union Nationale and René Hamel of the Bloc populaire.

Member of Parliament

In the 1949 election, Richard successfully ran as a Liberal candidate for the federal district of Saint-Maurice—Laflèche, against Hamel, who was the incumbent.

He was re-elected in 1953, 1957 and 1958, but remained a backbencher.

He lost his re-election bid in 1962, against Social Credit candidate Gérard Lamy.

Under his tenure, a new main post office was constructed at 395 Avenue de la Station and the 62nd (Shawinigan) Field Artillery Regiment moved into a new armory, located at 1825 Boulevard Royal.

Footnotes

1887 births
1964 deaths
Members of the House of Commons of Canada from Quebec
Liberal Party of Canada MPs
People from Centre-du-Québec